Rubicon is a locality in Victoria, Australia, located in the Shire of Murrindindi. It is situated on the Rubicon River. In the 2016 census, Rubicon had a population of 56.

Much of the locality consists today of forested protected areas, variously including the Yarra Ranges National Park, Rubicon State Forest, Rubicon Valley Historic and Cultural Features Reserve, Marysville State Forest, Mount Bullfight Nature Conservation Reserve and Cathedral Range State Park.

It was once home to a significant timber industry, which was connected to the railhead at Alexandra by a network of tramways. It was severely damaged by the 1939 Black Friday bushfires and the local sawmill industry was phased out by 1953, though the forest continues to be used for logging to some extent.  The Rubicon Hydro-Electric Scheme was established in 1928–29 to harness electricity from the Rubicon River and Royston River, and still functions today, though providing a far smaller proportion of the state's electricity than it once did. It is listed on the Victorian Heritage Register.

A small township, Tin Hut, servicing the timber and hydroelectric workers, was located at the corner of Royston Road and Herbs Road. It formerly had a state school (Rubicon Junction State School), post office and store. The 1947 post office and store building is the last surviving building from the settlement; it closed in June 1964 and is now privately owned. One of the three camping areas at Rubicon is located at the former townsite.

Climate

Rubicon has a cold rainforest climate, typical of the Victorian high country's southwestern face. The region is often affected by heavy snow for much of the winter as a result of the extreme precipitation brought about by frontal systems off the Southern Ocean.

References

Towns in Victoria (Australia)
Shire of Murrindindi